The South American Mission Society was founded at Brighton in 1844 as the Patagonian Mission. Captain Allen Gardiner, R.N., was the first secretary. The name "Patagonian Mission" was retained for twenty years, when the new title was adopted. The name of the organisation was changed after the death of Captain Gardiner, who died of starvation in 1851 on Picton Island in South America, waiting for a supply ship from England. Gardiner thought that the original mission should be expanded from southern South America (Patagonia) to all of South America. Charles Darwin is reported to have supported the society financially and rhetorically.

The Society's purpose is to recruit, send, and support Christian missionaries in South America. There were nationally based SAMS organisations in Britain, Ireland, Canada, Australia, New Zealand and the United States but during the 1990s those in Australia and New Zealand were merged with the Church Missionary Society in those countries. In 2009 the 'mother' society in Britain was also merged with CMS. SAMS was one of the early members of Faith2Share the international network of mission agencies, and the SAMS organisations in Ireland, Canada and the USA continue to play an active role within that network.

Captain Gardiner's attempts
Commencing in 1838, Captain Allen Gardiner made several attempts to bring Protestant Christianity to the native peoples of South America. Returning to England in 1843 he sought support for his efforts; no British church or missionary society offered to help, so he founded his own South American Mission. His first effort to set up a mission at Gregory Bay in the Straits of Magellan in 1845 was repulsed by the natives. He worked in Bolivia in 1845–1847, but that mission effort was suppressed by the Roman Catholic clergy.

Gardiner organized another effort through the Society. With four sailors and a carpenter, he left Cardiff on the Clymene on 7 January 1848. They landed at Picton Island in Tierra del Fuego on 23 March.  After being harassed by the natives, Gardiner's party re-boarded the ship. It sailed for Valparaiso on 1 April and they eventually returned to England.

Based on these experiences, Captain Gardiner decided that to be successful, he needed a small seaworthy vessel as a base from which he could approach the natives with some degree of security.  The Reverend George Pakenham Despard of Redlands, Bristol was appointed Honorary Secretary of the Patagonian Missionary Society in March 1850.  With his organisational skill the society obtained donations, but not enough to build the 120-ton schooner Gardiner wanted. Two 26-foot launches, Pioneer and Speedwell, were built for his use in the islands.

Gardiner and six other men were landed at Picton Island on 5 December 1850. After again failing to engage with the Fuegians, and beset by planning failures and mishaps (such as leaving all their shot behind), by March 1851 they had fled the island, sailing east along the Beagle Channel to Spaniard Harbour, a bay at the mouth of Cooks River. By September, all had died of starvation, the delivery of fresh stores organised by the Society in England having also been delayed .

The schooner Allen Gardiner

In Britain, Captain Gardiner and his party were lauded as martyrs, and donations to the Patagonian Missionary Society poured in.  There was sufficient money to build a schooner of the type that Gardiner had originally wanted.  The keel was laid down at Kelly's yards, Dartmouth, on 1 November 1853 and she was launched as the Allen Gardiner on 11 July 1854: a vessel of 89 tons register on dimensions of 64.0 x 17.2 x 10.6 ft. She sailed from Bristol on 24 October 1854, under the command of Captain William Parker Snow.  No missionary having been employed at this stage, the party included a catechist James Garland Phillips, a doctor James A. Ellis, a mason and a carpenter.  They established a settlement named Cranmer at Keppel Island in the Falkland Islands.

The mission suffered many difficulties, due at least in part to disagreements Captain Parker Snow had with Phillips, his crew, and Governor George Rennie, who did not support the Society's intention to encourage Tierra del Fuegians to leave their own islands to be taught at Cranmer.  The first missionary engaged in England, the Reverend E. A. Verity, was arrested on bankruptcy charges shortly before he was to leave England.  Captain Snow offered to take Phillips on a reconnaissance voyage to Tierra del Fuego in October 1855, and they made amicable contacts with natives at several locations culminating in the discovery of Jemmy Button at Wulaia on 1 November.  They also reburied the remains of Captain Gardiner and his party.

In December 1855 George Packenham Despard was appointed missionary and arrived at Port Stanley in the Falkland Islands on 30 August 1856.  Here disagreements with the recalcitrant captain of the Allen Gardiner came to a head, and he was dismissed.  Parker Snow returned to England, where he sued the Society for unlawful dismissal, but ultimately lost.  Despite this the Society received considerable criticism of its actions, in part because at this point in its history, it was still a private organisation that was not attached to any of the established churches.

The Wulaia Massacre
George Packenham Despard managed to convince Jemmy Button, one of his wives and three children to visit Cranmer, and after many months there they were returned to Wulaia in December 1858.  At the same time a party of nine Fuegians were encouraged to visit to Cranmer.  This party, without any of Button's previous European experiences, soon became home-sick and, in addition, there were serious cultural misunderstandings between them and the Europeans. In October 1859 they were returned to Wulaia, arriving on 2 November after a very rough passage in the Allen Gardiner.  Four days later, while holding a Sunday service in a small chapel built at the settlement, Garland Phillips and all but one of the ship's crew were clubbed to death in a general massacre.  The only survivor was the ship's cook, who was still on board the Allen Gardiner when the massacre occurred, and managed to escape in a dinghy.  He managed to make peace with the natives before search parties discovered the stripped and abandoned schooner on 1 March 1860.

Aftermath

Despite calls from many on the Falkland Islands for punitive measures against the Fuegians, the Government refused to sanction any.  Nervous of reprisals, the natives became more receptive to missionary activity.  George Packenham Despard resigned as missionary, and returned to England in the Allen Gardiner in 1862.  His adopted son Thomas Bridges remained at Cranmer, where he was joined by Despard's replacement, former Society Secretary the Reverend Waite Hockin Stirling (1829–1923).

In 1865 Allen Gardiner returned to England once more, this time with four Fuegian boys, two of whom (including one of Jemmy Button's sons) died during their voyage home in 1866.  In 1867 a mission settlement was built on Tierra del Fuego itself and on 21 December 1869 Waite Stirling was proclaimed Bishop of the Falkland Islands at Westminster Abbey, finally legitimising the South American Missionary Society under the auspices of the Church of England.  Stirling held the post for 32 years, during which time, unfortunately, a considerable proportion of the native population of Tierra del Fuego was massacred by gold miners and ranchers.

Over the years the Society owned three ships named Allen Gardiner – the first was sold and replaced by a smaller 41-ton ketch in 1874, and that vessel was replaced by an 80 ft. steamer in 1884.  This last Allen Gardiner'''s engine was removed in 1887, and she worked as a sailing vessel until being sold in 1896, by which time regular steamship services operated between the Falkland Islands and Tierra del Fuego.

Other missions
In 1860 Allen Gardiner Jr. established a second mission station at Lota, Chile, and later won important official concessions against the incumbent Catholic clergy.  This was the first of many successful missions that the South American Missionary Society founded on mainland South America.

See also

Martin Gusinde Anthropological Museum with the history of the Sterling HouseReferences

 Despard. Hope Deferred, Not Lost. R. Hitchman ("Secretary to the Christian Alliance for the Suppression of Intemperance and for Promoting the Better Observance of the Sabbath"), The Patagonian Mission: The Missionary Adventures of Captain Allen Gardiner, R.N., The Pioneer of the Patagonian Missionary Society, An Essay Read Before the Pembroke Society, Liverpool, W. Pearnall & Co., 1856.
 "M.C.M.L.," Providence, or the Early History of Three Barbarians, Edinburgh, William P. Kennedy, 1857.
 Parker Snow, William, A Two Years' Cruise off Tierra del Fuego, the Falkland Islands, Patagonia and in the River Plate: A Narrative of Life in the Southern Seas, the author, 1857.
 Parker Snow, William, The Patagonian Missionary Society and Some Truths Associated With It, London, Piper, Stephenson & Spence, 1858.
 The Committee of the Patagonian Missionary Society, A Brief Reply to Certain Charges made Against the Patagonian, or South American Missionary Society, by W. Parker Snow, late master of the "Allen Gardiner" Mission Schooner, Bristol, Isaac Chillcott, 1857.
 G. W. Phillips, The Missionary Martyr of Tierra del Fuego, Being the Memoir of J. Garland Phillips, Late Catechist of the Patagonian, or South American Mission Society, London, Wertheim, Macintosh & Hunt, 1861
 John A. Marsh & Waite H. Stirling, The Story of Captain Allen Gardiner, R.N., with Sketches of Missionary Work in South America, James Nisbet, London in 1867
 Jesse Page, Captain Allen Gardiner: Sailor and Saint, London, S. W. Partridge & Co., n.d. (c1900).
 Eric Earl Shipton, Tierra del Fuego: The Fatal Lodestone, Readers Union, 1974.
 Nick Hazlewood, Savage: The Life and Times of Jemmy Button'', London, Hodder & Staughton, 2000.
1

Religious organizations established in 1844
1844 in Christianity
Christian missions in South America
Christian organizations established in the 19th century
Anglican denominations in South America
1844 establishments in the United Kingdom
Anglican mission in Tierra del Fuego